Open Book is a technical rock climbing route at Tahquitz Rock, in Riverside County, California.  Since the Yosemite Decimal System was developed at Tahquitz it is no coincidence that the first climb to be rated 5.9, Open Book, is also located at Tahquitz.  In 1952, when Royal Robbins climbed it free, it was one of the most difficult free ascents in the country.

References

External links 
supertopo
mountainproject.com

Climbing routes